Hayes St Leger, 3rd Viscount Doneraile (9 May 1786 – 27 March 1854) was an Anglo-Irish peer.

Doneraile was the son of Hayes St Leger, 2nd Viscount Doneraile and Charlotte Bernard. He served as an officer in the South Cork Militia, eventually attaining the rank of colonel. On 8 November 1819, he inherited his father's viscountcy and was elected as a representative peer to the British House of Lords in 1830. He married Lady Charlotte Esther Bernard, daughter of Francis Bernard, 1st Earl of Bandon and Lady Catherine Henrietta Boyle, on 14 June 1816.

References

1786 births
1853 deaths
Viscounts in the Peerage of Ireland
19th-century Anglo-Irish people
Irish representative peers
Hayes